Luis Miguel Bethelmy Villarroel (born 14 October 1986) is a Venezuelan professional basketball player who plays in the power forward position for the Venezuela national basketball team and currently plays for Venezuelan club Guaros de Lara in the Liga Profesional de Baloncesto league. He is nicknamed as "the Tsunami". Luis was part of the Venezuelan squad during the 2019 FIBA Basketball World Cup, where the team ended up at 14th position.

National team career 
Luis Bethelmy made his senior international debut for Venezuela during the 2007 FIBA Americas Championship. He has represented Venezuela at the Pan American Games twice in 2015, 2019 and also took part at the 2009 FIBA Americas Championship and 
2013 FIBA Americas Championship. He made his FIBA Basketball World Cup debut for Venezuela at the 2019 edition, which also saw Venezuela's return to the tournament for the first time since 2006 FIBA Basketball World Cup.

Club career 
He made his club debut for Cocodrilos de Caracas in 2007 before being drafted into NBA in 2008. He was part of the Guaros de Lara club which was crowned world basketball club champions at the 2016 FIBA Intercontinental Cup, after beating the German club Skyliners Frankfurt in the final. He was also member of the Guaros de Lara club which emerged as runners-up to Spanish club Iberostar Tenerife at the 2017 FIBA Intercontinental Cup.

References

External links
 RealGM profile

1986 births
Living people
Ángeles de Puebla (basketball) players
Basketball players at the 2015 Pan American Games
Basketball players at the 2019 Pan American Games
Cocodrilos de Caracas players
Gimnasia y Esgrima de Comodoro Rivadavia basketball players
Guaros de Lara (basketball) players
Halcones Rojos Veracruz players
Libertadores de Querétaro players
Pan American Games competitors for Venezuela
Power forwards (basketball)
Venezuelan expatriate basketball people in Argentina
Venezuelan expatriate basketball people in Colombia
Venezuelan expatriate basketball people in the Dominican Republic
Venezuelan expatriate basketball people in Mexico
Venezuelan men's basketball players
2019 FIBA Basketball World Cup players